Kobiljek is a former village in central Slovenia in the Municipality of Zagorje ob Savi. It is now part of the village of Borje. It is part of the traditional region of Upper Carniola and is now included in the Central Sava Statistical Region.

Geography
Kobiljek lies north of Borje, in a pass between Jablana Peak (elevation ) to the east and Pleše Hill (elevation ) to the northwest. Kobiljek Hill (elevation ) rises to the southeast. It is accessible by a road from Jablana.

Name
The name Kobiljek is related to toponyms such as Kobilje and Koble, and it is derived from Slavic *kobyla 'mare'.

History
Kobiljek was annexed by Borje in 1953, ending its existence as a separate settlement.

References

External links
Kobiljek on Geopedia

Populated places in the Municipality of Zagorje ob Savi
Former settlements in Slovenia